The Movima people are an ethnic group in Bolivia. There were 18,879 of them in 2012 of whom 675 speak the Movima language natively.

References

Ethnic groups in Bolivia